The Soviet Union minted a series of commemorative platinum coins from 1977 to 1991.

Eleven commemorative platinum coins with a 150-ruble face value were minted, some as part of a series commemorating the 1980 Summer Olympics. The price for proof platinum coins of the USSR typically exceeds $1,500 per coin.

1980 Olympics commemorative issue

The following coins forms part of the commemorative coin series minted for the 1980 Summer Olympics in Moscow, along with cupronickel coins, silver 5 and 10 rubles, and gold 100 ruble coins.

These "XXII Summer Olympic Games" platinum coins depicted the emblem of the Olympics and fragments of the ancient Olympic Games, and were issued in the period 1977–1980 in the two versions, proof and uncirculated. The proof minting technique (coins with mirrored background and frosted image) was first introduced in the Soviet Union in 1977 specifically for the Olympic commemorative series, and its quality (especially of the snow-like images) has been praised by experts.

Other designs (1988-1991)

Although the Soviet Union issued commemorative platinum coins every year since 1977, designs unrelated to the Olympics appeared only in 1988 with the series "1000 years of ancient coinage, literature, architecture and the Baptism of Russia", along with silver, gold, platinum, and palladium coins. The series marked the first time palladium was used in minting coins. This series was highly praised internationally and awarded the first prize for the quality of minting at the 1988 numismatic exhibition in Basel.

See also
 List of commemorative coins of the Soviet Union
 Platinum coins of the Russian Empire
 Platinum coins of the Russian Federation

References

Platinum coins
Coins of Russia